Greatest Remix Hits is a 2006 remix album and DVD compilation by 2 Unlimited, a Eurodance project founded in 1991 by Belgian producers Jean-Paul DeCoster and Phil Wilde and fronted by Dutch rapper Ray Slijngaard and Dutch vocalist Anita Doth.

Album information
The Greatest Remix Hits album comes with a DVD featuring their music videos (the same one included with The Complete History released in 2004).

Release history
This compilation has been re-released in several countries around the world since the original Australian release. Some of these countries include South Africa, Argentina and much of Europe.

Track listing

CD 
 Get Ready For This (Orchestral Mix)
 Twilight Zone (Rave Version)
 No Limits (Extended)
 Tribal Dance (Long Version)
 Here I Go (X Out In Club)
 Real Thing (Extended)
 No One (Unlimited Remix)
 Let The Beat Control Your Body (Extended)
 Magic Friend (Extended)
 Nothing Like The Rain (Rainy Remix)
 Workaholic (Extended)
 Faces (Automatic Breakbeat Remix)
 Murphy's Megamix (Part 1)

DVD 

 No Limit
 Faces
 Maximum Overdrive
 Let the Beat Control Your Body
 The Real Thing
 No One
 The Magic Friend
 Workaholic
 Get Ready for This
 Tribal Dance
 Nothing Like the Rain
 Here I Go
 Jump For Joy
 Do What's Good for Me
 Spread Your Love
 No Limit 2.3 (Master Blaster remix)
 Countdown Special

References

2 Unlimited albums
2006 albums
2006 video albums